Gò Công was a region consisting of:
Gò Công
Gò Công Đông
Gò Công Tây